Victor Morales (born 1 November 1943) is a former Ecuadorian cyclist. He competed in the individual road race and the team time trial events at the 1968 Summer Olympics.

References

External links
 

1943 births
Living people
Ecuadorian male cyclists
Olympic cyclists of Ecuador
Cyclists at the 1968 Summer Olympics